Vinnikov and Vinnikova is a Russian surname. Notable people with the surname include:

Alexander Vinnikov (born 1955), Russian politician
Anastasia Vinnikova (born 1991), Belarusian singer
Isaak Natanovich Vinnikov (1897-1973), Russian Jewish Arabist
Ivan Vinnikov (born 1964), Russian footballer
Zino Vinnikov (born 1943), Russian-Dutch violinist

Russian-language surnames